Union Township is a township in Kossuth County, Iowa, United States.

History
Union Township was organized in 1883.

References

Townships in Kossuth County, Iowa
Townships in Iowa
1883 establishments in Iowa
Populated places established in 1883